State Highway 274 (SH 274) is a Texas state highway that runs from Kemp south to Trinidad along the western side of Cedar Creek Reservoir.  The route was designated on August 1, 1938 along its current route.

Junction list

References

274
Transportation in Henderson County, Texas
Transportation in Kaufman County, Texas